The hawthorn miner bee (Andrena crataegi) is a species of miner bee in the family Andrenidae which is in the order Hymenoptera ("ants, bees, wasps and sawflies"). Another common name for this species is hawthorn andrena.
It is found in North America.

References

Further reading

External links
NCBI Taxonomy Browser, Andrena crataegi

crataegi